The role of the Commando Logistic Regiment (CLR), Royal Marines is to provide second line Combat Service Support to 3 Commando Brigade.

It is 3 Commando Brigade's dedicated logistic unit and provides all second line Combat Service Support to the force, supporting it with a constant re-supply chain from initial assault to the final phase of any operation. CLR is unique in that it is able to provide essential supplies for front-line Commando units for the initial 30 days of any operation by the transfer of stores from ship to shore – making it totally self-sufficient.

"A formation's combat capability is defined by its ability to support itself logistically on operations. The organised control, distribution and availability of material will directly influence the Commander's ability to achieve his objective."

Personnel
Personnel are mainly drawn from the Royal Navy, but include some from the Army all have the opportunity to pass the All Arms Commando Course whilst serving with the regiment. Royal Marines Band Service members also serve with the regiment in their secondary operational roles.

Organisation
Based at RM Chivenor in North Devon, the Commando Logistic Regiment role is to ensure the re-supply of ammunition, water, fuel and food, known as "combat supplies" to the ground forces, and provide specialist services to sustain the brigade's operations. The regiment is divided into Squadrons:
Headquarters Squadron
Headquarters Squadron (HQ Sqn) is the biggest and most diverse Squadron within the regiment. When fully manned, it has just over 200 personnel spanning 8 departments. Its primary role is to co-ordinate the command and control function of logistic distribution, relaying stores information by computer from ship to shore and collating field requirements from forward units and assessing their priority of order for delivery or recovery. The Squadron is also responsible for providing what is termed 'first line' or initial support to the Regiment.
Equipment Support Squadron
The Equipment Support Squadron provides the second line repair and recovery for all the equipment used by 3 Commando Brigade. The repair of equipment can range from a rifle through to the replacement of entire engines systems. While the Squadron is primarily manned by Royal Marines, it also contains some Army personnel, from trades such as Vehicle Mechanics, Armourers and Metalsmiths. Operating in small teams, these personnel are trained to repair and recover all vehicles used by the Brigade. The Squadron ensures that vehicles are repaired as close to the front line as possible, in order that they can be returned to the battle quickly and efficiently.
Logistic Support Squadron
The Squadron is composed of a headquarters and three Troops made up from a combination of Royal Marines and the Army's Royal Logistic Corps (RLC) personnel. The squadron's role is to provide 3 Commando Brigade with 2nd line logistic support that includes transport, stores and bulk fuel. Technical Troop holds 60 days of fast moving, technical and general spares and has the ability to deploy airportable, Advance Ordnance Detachments (AODs). Petroleum Troop operates Truck Transporters Fuel (TTF). They have the ability to work from 'Ship-to-Shore' with various specialist equipment and have the responsibility for the installation of Bulk Fuel Installations (BFIs). Transport Troop uses Demountable Rack Offload Pickup System (DROPS) vehicles to provide the lift needed to supply combat supplies, artillery ammunition and engineering equipment.
Medical Squadron
The Medical Squadron provides flexible, emergency medical and surgical support to 3 Commando Brigade on operations around the world. Manned by Royal Navy Medical Assistants (MAs), Naval Nurses (NNs), Forward Surgical Teams (FSTs) and Royal Marines Commandos, the Medical Squadron, comprises a headquarters and two Commando Forward Surgical Groups, CFSGs. Each one of these is configured to deploy forward to allow Damage Control Surgery, saving life and limb, to be performed within two hours of troops being injured. The squadron is still restructuring itself following Operation TELIC in order to be better able to provide a versatile, modular, rapidly deployable and effective medical facility. Each CFSG consists of Medical Sections, an 'A&E department', FSTs, an 'operating theatre', EVAC sections, a recovery ward and patient care for up to six hours, and Ambulance sections.
Viking Squadron
VIKING Squadron (VS) is a dedicated Royal Marine sub-unit of the Commando Logistic Regiment (CLR) based in Chivenor, N Devon. Made up largely of Royal Marines Armoured Support specialists, the Squadron's role is to provide Protected Mobility and intimate tactical support to 3 Commando Brigade RM. The specialisation is formed into a Squadron of four independent VIKING Troops to support fast moving, lightly armoured expeditionary warfare for the Lead Commando Group. A VIKING Troop consists of 16 VIKING ATVs and can be augmented by mortar and fire support sections. In addition to the four deployable Troops, the Squadron has its own Trials & Training Wing and a Support Troop with Vehicle Mechanics, Signallers, Stores Accountants and Clerical Staff.
Landing Force Support Squadron
This Squadron is organised and tailored to support designated tasks. It would be landed immediately after the ground troops during the initial stage of an amphibious operation. It provides control of beach and landing support areas and specific Combat Service Support to the Landing Force. When the remainder of the Commando Logistic Regiment is landed, the LFSS is subsumed into the Regiment's functional areas. Should the distance between the Regiment and ground troops become extended, the LFSS would be deployed forward to once again provide intimate support.
Logistic Task Group
On 1 December 2009, the Logistic Task Group was formed. It is capable of deploying worldwide in less than five days. The Logistic Task Group, or 'LTG' for short, is part of the United Kingdom’s ‘Small Scale Contingent Battlegroup’. The LTG will provide immediate sustainment to the Battlegroup wherever they are deployed; enabling equipment repair and recovery, logistic supply and distribution and above all, medical support. Designed carefully to complement the Battlegroup’s organic logistic capabilities, the LTG will enable extra reach and endurance demanded by global operations. Forged together since September 2009, and exercised extensively on Exercise Orange Marauder in November, the team achieved a well earned endorsement and validation by the United Kingdom’s Permanent Joint Headquarters and Chief of Joint Operations. From the frozen arctic tundra or tropical desert hinterland through to arid desert plains, the LTG is now ready to launch wherever and whenever needed.
383 Commando Petroleum Troop (Volunteers)

383 Commando Petroleum Troop of the Royal Logistic Corps is responsible for the handling, supply and storage of bulk fuels from ship to shore and under front line combat conditions. It is a Commando unit and all its members must pass the All Arms Commando Course in order to serve with their Regular counterparts in the Commando Logistic Regiment in 3 Commando Brigade, Royal Marines.

See also
3 Commando Brigade
Royal Marines

External links
 Commando Logistic Regiment

References

Commandos (United Kingdom)
Royal Marine formations and units
Military logistics units and formations of the United Kingdom
Military units and formations of the United Kingdom in the Falklands War
Marine regiments